Tarana is a type of composition in Hindustani classical vocal music in which certain words (e.g. "odani", "todani", "tadeem" and "yalali") based on Persian and Arabic phonemes are rendered at a medium (madhya laya) or fast (drut laya) rate. It was invented by Amir Khusro (1253-1325 CE),. In modern times, the singer Amir Khan helped popularize it and researched its origins and the syllables used. Nissar Hussain Khan was a tarana singer. Tarana was also used by Sikh tenth Guru Gobind Singh in his compositions.

Form
A second, contrasting melody, usually with higher notes, is introduced once before returning to the main melody. The tarana may include a Persian quatrain, and may use syllables from sitar or tabla such as "dar-dar" or "dir-dir"; singers might recite full compositions (e.g. tihais, gats, tukdas) within the body of the tarana.

History
Thakur Jaidev Singh, a commentator on Indian music, said:

References

Indian styles of music
Hindustani music
Hindustani music terminology